Kuchugury is a village in Temryuksky District, Krasnodar Krai, Russia, located on the Taman Peninsula on the western shore of the Temryuk Bay on the Sea of Azov. Kuchugury is located 38 km west of Temryuk, and 164 km west of Krasnodar.

References

Urban-type settlements in Krasnodar Krai
Temryuksky District